John William Dylan Taite (2 November 193722 January 2003) was a New Zealand rock music journalist. Born in Liverpool, he began working as a television journalist in New Zealand in the early 1970s. A passionate music fan (and, during his youth, a drummer), he soon began making his reputation with eccentric interviews of top musicians which came as close to gonzo journalism as New Zealand had known. Among his more notable interview subjects were Bob Marley and Lou Reed.

Trying to separate the truth from the myth in Taite's career is difficult, but he was as highly regarded by musicians as by the public and was able to gain access to frank interviews with normally reticent stars. His interviews of Bob Marley (while playing games of soccer) are regarded as the best the reggae musician ever gave. Taite is also reputed to have been behind some of the publicity stunts connected with Malcolm McLaren's time as manager of The Sex Pistols. One of the ideas Taite is said to have given to Malcolm McLaren was that the Sex Pistols should sign their contract to EMI outside Buckingham Palace.

Taite was involved in a car accident in December 2002. Although he did not appear badly injured at the time, his health deteriorated, and he lapsed into a coma the following month. He died on 22 January 2003.

References

Dylan Taite R.I.P. 23 January 2003. Accessed 13 August 2007.
Harmer, Brian. 26 January 2003. Broadcaster Dylan Taite dies WYSIWYG, New Zealand News. Accessed 13 August 2007.
Tizard, Hon Judith. 23 January 2003. NZ culture richer for Dylan Taite's contribution Accessed 13 August 2007.

External links
Punk On Punk
 (from Television New Zealand's One News)

Interview with Kate Bush in 1978

1937 births
2003 deaths
Journalists from Liverpool
English emigrants to New Zealand
20th-century New Zealand journalists